The 2005 FIBA Africa Basketball Club Championship (20th edition), was an international basketball tournament  held in Abidjan, Ivory Coast, from December 13 to 22, 2007. The tournament, organized by FIBA Africa and hosted by Abidjan Basket Club, was contested by 7 teams in a preliminary round robin system followed by a knockout stage by the top four teams.
 
The tournament was won by Abidjan Basket Club from Ivory Coast.

Qualification

Participating teams

Squads

Preliminary round 

Times given below are in UTC.

Knockout stage

Classification

Semifinals

Bronze medal game

Gold medal game

Final standings

ABC rosterAbou Fofana, Aboud Bakayoko, Aka Diamah, Aristide Yao, Blaise Amalabian, Eric Affi, Guy Touali, Jean Besse, Kouamé Abo, Morlaye Bangoura, N'Dri Kouakou, Stéphane Konaté, Coach:

Statistical Leaders

All Tournament Team

See also 
2005 FIBA Africa Championship

References

External links 
 2005 FIBA Africa Champions Cup Official Website
 FIBA Africa official website

2005 FIBA Africa Basketball Club Championship
2005 FIBA Africa Basketball Club Championship
2005 FIBA Africa Basketball Club Championship
Sports competitions in Ivory Coast
Basketball in Ivory Coast